The Thiruvananthapuram Zoo (also known as Trivandrum Zoo) is located in the city of Thiruvananthapuram, the capital of Kerala, India. It occupies  of woodland, lakes, and lawns.

History
Thiruvananthapuram Zoo is one of the oldest zoos in India. Similarly the Museum and Botanical Gardens are also one of the oldest of their kind in the country. Swathi Thirunal Rama Varma (1816–1846), the ruler of Travancore during 1830–1846, was the visionary behind the establishment of the Thiruvananthapuram Museum and Zoo. He had a broad variety of animals, including elephants in his horse breeding centre. In the Trivandrum, stables he incorporated a menagerie and kept tigers, panthers cheetahs, deer, bears and a lioness there. It was however left to his brother Uthram Thirunal Marthanda Varma and the then British Resident General Cullen which resulted in the establishment of  Napier Museum and Zoo in Thiruvananthapuram. A committee was formed in 1855 with the Maharaja of Travancore as Patron, General Cullen as president, The Elaya Raja as vice president and Mr. Allen Brown as Secretary of the Committee and the Director of Museum. The Museum was thrown open to the Public in September 1857. But the Museum by itself could not attract the people much, and therefore a Zoo and a park were started in 1859. The zoo was originally built with the typical iron-barred cages prevalent at the time, and was designed for recreational purposes, but with increased loss of forest and wildlife due to human development, the goal of the Zoo has changed from recreation to conservation.

A modernization project started in 1995, aims to gradually replace the old enclosures with spacious naturalistic enclosures. The state government of Kerala is undertaking this renovation with financial and technical help from the Central Zoo Authority.

Mammals
The Thiruvananthapuram Zoo is home to 82 species from around the world. Indigenous species at the zoo include lion-tailed macaque, Nilgiri langur, Indian rhinoceros, Asiatic lion, royal Bengal tiger, white tiger and leopard, as well as nine Asian elephants (as of 31 March 2009). in 2020, animals from Africa include giraffes, hippos, zebras, and Cape buffalos.

The zoo also includes a snake farm called 'The Reptile House', which exhibits both poisonous and non-poisonous snakes. It also houses 7 Anacondas too.

Birds

 Ostrich
 Scarlet macaw
 Green-winged macaw
 Indian peafowl
 White spoonbill
 Greater flamingo
 Cassowary
 Sulfur-crested cockatoo
 Common crane
 White-necked crane
 Black-necked crane 
Grey heron
 White ibis
 Blossom headed parakeet
 Rose-ringed parakeet
 Alexandrine parakeet
 Mustached parakeet
 Gray pelican
 Rosy pelican
 Silver pheasant
 Ring-necked pheasant
 Rock dove
 Adjutant stork
 Painted stork
 White stork
 White necked stork
 Black-necked stork
 Cinereous vulture
 King vulture
 White Backed vulture
 Turkey vulture
 Pariah kite
 Brahminy kite
 Emu

Reptiles
 Anaconda
 Reticulated Python
 Gharial
 Mugger crocodile
 Spectacled caiman
 Monitor lizard
 Bamboo pit viper
 Indian cobra
 Indian rock python
 Rat snake
 Russell's viper
 Checkered keelback
 King cobra
 Red sandboa
 Green tree snake
 Indian flapshell turtle
 Indian black turtle
 Crowned river turtle
 Travancore tortoise

Gallery

See also
 Delhi Zoo
 Mysore Zoo
 Thrissur Zoo

References

External links 

  Official Web Site
 Thiruvananthapuram Zoo Photographs, 2011
 Salman the fat jaguar

Zoos in Kerala
Tourist attractions in Thiruvananthapuram
1857 establishments in India
Zoos established in 1857